This is a list of the governors of the province of Bamyan, Afghanistan.

Governors of Bamyan Province

See also
 List of current governors of Afghanistan

Notes

Bamyan